The following is a timeline of the history of the city of Khartoum, Sudan.

Prehistoric times 

 circa 5000 BCE, first documented skull, human bones and tools found in 1945

19th century

 1821 - Settlement established by Ibrahim Pasha of Egypt.
 1824 - "Turko-Egyptian governor Uthman Bey establishes Khartoum as a military centre."
 1826 - Ali Khurshid Pasha in power.
 1829 - Mosque built.
 1830 - Town becomes capital of "the Sudanese possessions of Egypt."
 1838 - Disease outbreak; capital relocated temporarily to Shendi.
 1840 - Flood.
 1841 - Flood.
 1854 - Muhammad Sa'id Pasha in power.
 1856 - Disease outbreak; capital relocated temporarily to Shendi.
 1862 - Chamber of Commerce established.
 1866 - Consulates of Austria, France, Italy, Persia, and Tuscany established.
 1869 - Flood.
 1874 - Flood.
 1878 - Flood.
 1884 - 13 March: Siege of Khartoum begins.
 1885
 26 January: Mahdists in power.
 Capital relocated to Omdurman from Khartoum.
 1898
 2 September: Conflict between Mahdist and British forces.
 Seat of government relocates to Khartoum from Omdurman.
 1899
 Town becomes capital of Anglo-Egyptian Sudan.
 Railway begins operating (Wadi Halfa-Khartoum).
 Sudan Gazette (government newspaper) begins publication.

20th century

 1902
 Wellcome Tropical Research Laboratories and Coptic Girls School open.
 Population: 25,000.
 1903 - Gordon Memorial College opens.
 1905 - Military academy opens.
 1907 - Population: 69,349.
 1909 - Blue Nile Road and Railway Bridge built to Halfaya.
 1911 - Sudan Herald newspaper begins publication.
 1912 - Cathedral Church of All Saints consecrated.
 1913 - Famine.
 1924
 Demonstrations.
 Flood.
 Kitchener School of Medicine established.
 1926 - White Nile Bridge to Omdurman built.
 1928 - Unity High School for Girls founded.
 1946 - Flood.
 1950 - Al Khartoum Sports Club formed.
 1952 - Acropole Hotel in business.
 1954 - Population: 100,000 (approximate).
 1955 - Area of city: 7.9 square kilometers.
 1956
 1 January: City becomes capital of independent Republic of Sudan.
 University of Khartoum established.
 1957
 Municipal Stadium opens.
 Khartoum American School established.
 1960 - Bank of Sudan headquartered in Khartoum.
 1962 - Industrial Bank of Sudan opens.
 1964 - Population: 173,500.
 1967 - August: Arab League summit held.
 1970
 Area of city: 13.3 square kilometers.
 Bank of Khartoum established.
 1971
 National Museum of Sudan established.
 Population: 261,840.
 1973
 August: Anti-government unrest.
 Saudi embassy held by Palestinian militants.
 1974 - Catholic Metropolitan Archdiocese of Khartoum formed.
 1976 - Friendship Hall built.
 1977 - Oil pipeline to Port Sudan completed.
 1978 - July - Organisation of African Unity summit held.
 1980 - Area of city: 101.3 square kilometers.
 1983
 September: Islamic law in effect.
 University of Juba relocates to Khartoum (approximate date).
 1984
 March: Teacher/doctor strike begins.
 El-Sheikh Mosque built.
 1985
 March: Economic protest.
 Population: 1,611,000 (urban agglomeration).
 1988 - Flood.
 1990 - Population: 2,360,000 (urban agglomeration).
 1991
 City becomes part of Khartoum federal state (administrative region).
 Popular Arab and Islamic Congress held in city.
 1992 - Khartoum International Airport terminal opens.
 1993
 Khartoum Bank Group formed.
 Sudatel headquartered in Khartoum.
 Population: 924,505 city.
 1994 - Venezuelan criminal Carlos the Jackal arrested in Khartoum.
 1995
 Khartoum Stock Exchange begins trading.
 Population: 3,088,000 (urban agglomeration).
 1997 - Greater Nile Petroleum Operating Company incorporated.
 1998
 August: Al-Shifa pharmaceutical factory in Khartoum North bombed by U.S. forces.
 Area of city: 343.8 square kilometers.
 1999
 Ibrahim Malik Islamic Center built.
 Republican Palace Museum opens.
 Greater Nile Oil Pipeline in operation.
 2000
 Khartoum Monitor newspaper begins publication.
 Population: 3,505,000 (urban agglomeration).

21st century

2000s
 2005
 July: Demonstrations.
 Citizen (Juba) newspaper begins publication.
 Population: 3,979,000 (urban agglomeration).
 City designated an Arab Capital of Culture by Arab League/UNESCO.
 2006
 January: African Union summit held.
 March: Arab League summit held.
 2007 - El Mek Nimr Bridge to Khartoum North built.
 2008
 10–12 May: City besieged by anti-government forces.
 Population: 639,598.
 2009 - Tuti Bridge opens.

2010s
 2010 - Population: 4,516,000 (urban agglomeration).
 2012
 June: Economic protest.
 October: al-Yarmook armament factory bombed.

See also
 Khartoum history
 Timeline of Sudanese history
 List of universities in Khartoum

References

Bibliography

Published in 20th century
 
 Arkell, A. J. Early Khartoum. CUP, Cambridge 1949.
 
 
 
 
 
 McLean, W. H. The planning of Khartoum and Omdurman; transactions of the Town Planning Conference, October 1910. London 1919.
 
 
 
 
 
 Walkley, C. (1935). The story of Khartoum. Sudan Notes and Records, 18(2), 221-241.

Published in 21st century

External links

  (Bibliography of open access  articles)
  (Images, etc.)
  (Images, etc.)
  (Images, etc.)
  (Bibliography)
  (Bibliography)
  (Bibliography)
 

 
Khartoum
khartoum
Years in Sudan
Khartoum